Lobe may refer to:

People with the name
 Lobe (surname)

Science and healthcare
 Lobe (anatomy)
 Lobe, a large-scale structure of a radio galaxy
 Glacial lobe, a lobe-shaped glacier
 Lobation, a characteristic of the nucleus of certain biological cells  
 Acoustic lobe, radiation pattern exhibited by multi-driver loudspeakers
 Delta lobe or deltaic lobe, the projection of a river delta mouth into standing water
 Roche lobe, the region of space around a star in a binary system within which orbiting material is gravitationally bound to that star
 Sidelobe, an identifiable segment of an antenna radiation pattern
 Grating lobe, a sidelobe that is much higher than all other side lobes, approximately the same as the main beam — exists only in phased arrays
 Main lobe, the lobe containing the maximum power

Other uses
 Lobe, an oblong protrusion from a camshaft
 The Lobe, a character in Freakazoid!

See also
 Löbe, also spelled Loebe, a German surname

sv:Lob